Poppaea Sabina (AD 30 – 65), also known as Ollia, was a Roman empress as the second wife of the Emperor Nero. She had also been wife to the future emperor Otho. The historians of antiquity describe her as a beautiful woman who used intrigues to become empress.

There is a large villa near Pompeii that bears her name because of the archaeological finds there. It has been largely excavated and can be visited today.

Early life

Birth

Poppaea Sabina the Younger was born in Pompeii in AD 30 as the daughter of Titus Ollius and Poppaea Sabina the Elder. At birth and for most of her childhood she went by her proper patronymic nomen "Ollia", belonging to women of her father's gens, the Ollii, but at some point, probably before her first marriage, decided to start going by her mother's name instead, potentially due to her father's disgrace and suicide.

It is very likely that Poppaea's family came from Pompeii, and the common belief is that they might have been the owners of the Casa del Menandro (a house in Pompeii named for the painting of the 4th century BC playwright Menander that is found there). Most evidence suggesting Poppaea's Pompeiian origins comes from the 20th-century excavations of a town that was destroyed in the Eruption of Mount Vesuvius in 79. For instance, legal documents found during excavations in nearby Herculaneum described her as being the owner of a brick- or tile-work business in the Pompeii area. In particular, the sumptuous Villa Poppaea at Oplontis near Herculaneum is thought to have been her main residence outside Rome.

Family
Titus Ollius was a quaestor in the reign of the Emperor Tiberius. Ollius' friendship with the infamous imperial palace guardsman Lucius Aelius Sejanus ruined him before gaining public office. Titus Ollius was from Picenum (modern Marche and Abruzzo, Italy) and he was an unknown minor character in imperial politics. Titus Ollius died in 31AD.

Poppaea Sabina the Elder, her mother, was a distinguished woman, whom Tacitus praises as wealthy and "the loveliest woman of her day". In 47 AD, she committed suicide as an innocent victim of the intrigues of the Roman Empress Valeria Messalina, having been charged with committing adultery with former consul Decimus Valerius Asiaticus.

The father of Poppaea Sabina the Elder was Gaius Poppaeus Sabinus. This man of humble birth was consul in 9 AD and was the governor of Moesia from 12–35 AD. Passed during his consulship was the Lex Papia Poppaea, a law meant to strengthen and encourage marriage. Sabinus received a military triumph for ending a revolt in Thrace in 26 AD. From 15 AD until his death, he served as imperial Proconsul (or governor) of Greece and in other provinces. This competent administrator enjoyed the friendship of the Emperors Augustus and Tiberius. He died in late December of AD 35 from natural causes. After his death, Poppaea Sabina the Younger assumed the name of her maternal grandfather.

After Titus Ollius's death, Poppaea's mother married Publius Cornelius Lentulus Scipio the Elder, suffect consul, in 24 AD. Her siblings included stepbrother Publius Cornelius Lentulus Scipio the Younger, consul in 56 AD, and half-brother Publius Cornelius Scipio Asiaticus, suffect consul in 68 AD.

First marriage to Rufrius Crispinus
Poppaea's first marriage was to Rufrius Crispinus, a man of equestrian rank. They married in 44 AD, when Poppaea was 14 years old. He was the leader of the Praetorian Guard during the first 10 years of the reign of the Emperor Claudius until 51 AD, when Claudius' new wife, Agrippina the Younger, removed him from this position. Agrippina regarded him as loyal to the deceased Messalina's memory and replaced him with Sextus Afranius Burrus. Later, under Nero, he was executed. During their marriage, Poppaea gave birth to his son, a younger Rufrius Crispinus, who, after her death, would be drowned by Nero while on a fishing trip.

Second marriage to Otho
Poppaea then married Otho, a good friend of the new Emperor Nero who was seven years younger than she was. According to Tacitus, Poppaea married Otho only to get close to Nero. Nero fell in love with Poppaea, and she became his mistress.

Poppaea later divorced Otho and focused her attentions solely on becoming Nero's new wife. Otho was ordered away to be governor of Lusitania. (A decade later, after Nero's death, Otho became emperor, in succession to Galba.) Sources differ on when Poppaea divorced Otho: Tacitus dates the divorce to 58 AD, Suetonius dates it to after 59 AD.

Marriage to Nero and Empress of Rome
Tacitus depicts Poppaea as inducing Nero to murder his mother, Agrippina, in 59 AD so that she could marry him. Modern scholars, though, question the reliability of this story as Nero did not marry Poppaea until 62 AD and point to Suetonius's dating of the divorce from Otho. Some modern historians theorize that Nero's decision to kill Agrippina was prompted by her plotting to set Gaius Rubellius Plautus (Nero's maternal second cousin) on the throne rather than as a result of Poppaea's scheming.

With Agrippina gone, Poppaea pressured Nero to divorce and later execute his first wife and stepsister, Claudia Octavia, in order to marry her. Octavia was initially exiled to Campania, coincidentally the same general geographic area that Pompeii, Poppaea's place of birth, is located. She was then imprisoned on the island of Pandateria, a common sentence for members of the imperial family who fell from favor because of a charge of adultery.

During his eight-year marriage to Claudia Octavia, Nero fathered no children, and in AD 62, Poppaea became pregnant. When this happened, Nero divorced Octavia, claimed she was barren, and married Poppaea 12 days after the divorce. She bore Nero one daughter, Claudia Augusta, born on 21 January 63, who died at four months of age. At the birth of Claudia, Nero honoured mother and child with the title of Augusta.

Tacitus and Suetonius portray Poppaea as an ambitious and ruthless schemer. The Jewish historian Josephus paints a different picture. He calls Poppaea a worshipper of the God of Israel and writes that she urged Nero to show compassion to the Jewish people. In one account, Josephus shows how Poppaea advocated for the Jewish priests when an issue was brought before Nero by Herod Agrippa II, who was the Tetrarch of Jerusalem, concerning a wall that was built blocking Agrippa's view of the temple. She convinced Nero to not order the Jewish priests to tear down the wall and to leave the temple as is. However, in 64, Poppaea secured the position of procurator of Judaea for Gessius Florus, her friend's husband, who was harmful to the Jews.

Death
The cause and timing of Poppaea's death is uncertain. According to Suetonius, while she was awaiting the birth of her second child in the summer of 65, she quarrelled fiercely with Nero over his spending too much time at the races. In a fit of rage, Nero kicked her in the abdomen, causing her death. Tacitus, on the other hand, places the death after the Quinquennial Neronia (in 65 AD) and claims Nero's kick was a "casual outburst". Tacitus also mentions that some writers claimed Nero poisoned her, though Tacitus does not believe them. Cassius Dio claims Nero leapt upon her belly, but admitted that he did not know if it was intentional or accidental. 

Modern historians, though, keep in mind Suetonius's, Tacitus's, and Cassius Dio's severe biases against Nero and the impossibility of their knowing private events, and hence recognize that Poppaea may have died due to fatal complications of miscarriage or childbirth. Furthermore, a Greek poem encrypted on a frayed piece of papyrus reads that a deified Poppaea "made a loving farewell speech to Nero, before [ascending] off to heaven on a chariot driven by a goddess", indicating her death was not caused by an act of violence of Nero's.

When Poppaea died in 65, Nero went into deep mourning. Per the Roman imperial tradition, Poppaea was given a state funeral. In a departure from this cultural norm, however, she was not only embalmed, but also given divine honours alongside her daughter Claudia Augusta. Tacitus writes that Poppaea was embalmed by having her body filled with various herbs and spices and was buried in the Tomb of the Julii, but her actual burial spot is unknown. Nero supposedly burned a year's worth of Arabia's incense production at her funeral.

At the beginning of 66 AD, Nero married Statilia Messalina. After that, in 67 AD, Nero ordered Sporus, a young freedman, to be castrated and then married him; according to Cassius Dio, Sporus bore an uncanny resemblance to Poppaea, and Nero even called him by his dead wife's name.

Cultural references

In opera
Fifteen centuries after her time, Poppaea was depicted in Claudio Monteverdi's last opera, L'incoronazione di Poppea (The coronation of Poppaea) of 1642. Her story clearly was chosen to appeal to the titillation favoured in the nascent culture of the Venetian public opera theaters, and its prologue immediately explains that it is not a drama that promotes the triumph of virtue. Poppaea is portrayed as cynically plotting to become empress of Rome by manipulating the emperor Nero into marrying her, and her machinations include the execution of Seneca the Younger, who opposes her plans, which are successful at the end of the drama.

Poppaea is a principal character also in Handel's opera Agrippina of 1709, but as a victim, not a perpetrator, of deceit and manipulation. Here the schemer is Agrippina, Nero's mother, intent on promoting her son's claim to the throne. Poppaea, the ingenue, is portrayed as the object of desire of Claudius, Nero, and Otho, each of whom served for a time as Roman Emperor, whose rivalries Agrippina attempts to leverage to her advantage. Once Poppaea sees through Agrippina's deceit, she responds in kind, but only in order to be united with Otho, portrayed as her one true love.

In film
Poppaea appears as a character in the several cinema and TV versions of Henryk Sienkiewicz's novel Quo Vadis:
In the 1951 film version — in which she is played by Patricia Laffan in a widely praised performance — she is strangled to death by Nero, who blames her for turning his "loyal subjects", the Roman populace, against him. (This form of murder may have been suggested to the screenwriters by Suetonius' claim that Nero made several attempts to strangle his first wife, Octavia.)
In the 1985 international TV miniseries, Quo vadis, Poppaea was portrayed by Cristina Raines.

Another portrayal of Poppaea is featured in the 1932 film The Sign of the Cross. Daringly for the time, she is portrayed (by Claudette Colbert) as being openly bisexual, suggestively inviting a female slave to bathe with her, but lusting after Roman soldier Marcus Superbus (Fredric March).

In the 1976 BBC TV series I, Claudius, Poppaea was played by Sally Bazely.

Kara Tointon played Poppaea in 2003's Boudica, also known as Warrior Queen in the United States.

Poppaea is portrayed by Catherine McCormack in the 2006 BBC docudrama Ancient Rome: The Rise and Fall of an Empire. In this interpretation, she is kicked to death by Nero after offhandedly and uncritically mentioning a minor glitch during his performance at the Quinquennial Neronia. Her corpse is later shown mounted on display.

Rachel Yakar plays the part of Poppaea in the 1979 musical film of L'incoronazione di Poppea directed by Nikolaus Harnoncourt.

She is also a character in the 2004 drama film Nero, played by Elisa Tovati.

In Mel Brooks' 1968 film The Producers, Leo Bloom (Gene Wilder) is terrified by Max Bialystock (Zero Mostel) when the large man stands over him, and — in reference to Cassius Dio's account of Poppaea's death — screams: "You're going to jump on me. I know you're going to jump on me – like Nero jumped on Poppaea... Poppaea. She was his wife. And she was unfaithful to him.  So he got mad and he jumped on her. Up and down, up and down, until he squashed her like a bug. Please don't jump on me!"

In the 2013 Polish film Imperator, done entirely in Latin, Poppaea is played by Ewa Horwich. Here, Poppaea is depicted as outliving Nero and meeting her death in Germania after reuniting with Otho.

In music
The Gothic metal band Theatre of Tragedy wrote a song titled "Poppæa", inspired by her story, on their myth-based album Aégis.

See also
 Poppaea gens

References

Sources

Primary sources

Publius Cornelius Tacitus, Annals XIII.45–46, XIV.63–64, XVI.6
Suetonius, Lives of Caesars Life of Nero 35, Life of Otho 3
Cassius Dio, Roman History LXII.11–13, LXII.27, LXIII.9, LXIII.11, LXIII.13

Secondary sources

 Minaud, Gérard, Les vies de 12 femmes d’empereur romain - Devoirs, Intrigues & Voluptés , Paris, L’Harmattan, 2012, ch. 4,  La vie de Poppée, femme de Néron, p. 97-120.
 Donato, Giuseppe and Monique Seefried (1989). The Fragrant Past: Perfumes of Cleopatra and Julius Caesar. Emory University Museum of Art and Archaeology, Atlanta.

 
30 births
65 deaths
1st-century Roman empresses
Augustae
Deaths in childbirth
Deified Roman empresses
People from Pompeii (ancient city)
Sabina
Remarried royal consorts
Wives of Nero
Family of Otho
Year of birth unknown